Darrell Stewart Jr. (born July 14, 1996) is an American football wide receiver for the New Jersey Generals of the United States Football League (USFL). He played college football at Michigan State.

Early years
During his career at Nimitz High School, Stewart had 20 receptions for 466 yards and 4 touchdowns.

College career
After redshirting his first year at Michigan State in 2015, Stewart appeared in 10 games and made one start as a redshirt freshman, in which he recorded 3 receptions for 29 yards.

In his 2017 sophomore season, Stewart appeared in 13 games, in which he recorded 50 receptions for 501 yards and 2 touchdowns.

In his 2018 junior season, Stewart appeared in 11 games and made eight starts, and he missed two games due to injury. In those games, he recorded 48 receptions for 413 yards and 1 touchdown. He also won the team's Tommy Love Award for the most improved offensive player and the Doug Weaver "Oil Can" Award for the team humorist during this season.

In his 2019 senior season, Stewart appeared in 9 games and made eight starts, and he missed 4 games due to injury in November. In those games, he recorded 49 receptions for 697 yards and 4 touchdowns. He also won the team's Biggie Munn Award for most inspirational player on offense.

Professional career

Green Bay Packers
Stewart went undrafted in the 2020 NFL Draft. On April 29, 2020, Stewart was signed by the Green Bay Packers as an undrafted free agent. The Packers waived Stewart on August 15, 2020.

Carolina Panthers
Stewart had a tryout with the Carolina Panthers on August 23, 2020, and signed with the team three days later. He was waived on September 5, 2020.

New Jersey Generals
Stewart signed with the New Jersey Generals of the United States Football League on September 17, 2022.

References

External links

1996 births
Living people
American football wide receivers
Players of American football from Houston
Green Bay Packers players
Michigan State Spartans football players
Carolina Panthers players
New Jersey Generals (2022) players